Bangor University is a public university in Bangor, Wales. It received its Royal Charter in 1885 and was one of the founding institutions of the federal University of Wales. Officially known as University College of North Wales (UCNW), and later University of Wales, Bangor (UWB), in 2007 it became Bangor University, independent from the University of Wales.

History

Early years

The university was founded as the University College of North Wales (UCNW) on 18 October 1884, with an inaugural address by the Earl of Powis, the college's first President, in Penrhyn Hall. There was then a procession to the college including 3,000 quarrymen (quarrymen from Penrhyn Quarry and other quarries had subscribed more than 1,200 pounds to the university). The foundation was the result of a campaign for better provision of higher education in Wales that had involved some rivalry among towns in North Wales over which was to be the location of the new college.

The college was incorporated by Royal Charter in 1885. Its students received degrees from the University of London until 1893, when UCNW became a founding constituent institution of the federal University of Wales.

During the Second World War paintings from national art galleries were stored in the Prichard-Jones Hall at UCNW to protect them from enemy bombing. They were later moved to slate mines at Blaenau Ffestiniog. Students from University College, London, were evacuated to continue their studies in a safer environment at Bangor.

Post-war
During the 1960s, the university shared in the general expansion of higher education in the UK following the Robbins Report, with a number of new departments and new buildings. On 22 November 1965, during construction of an extension to the Department of Electronic Engineering in Dean Street, a crane collapsed on the building. The three-ton counterweight hit the second-floor lecture theatre in the original building about thirty minutes before it would have been occupied by about 80 first-year students. The counterweight went through to the ground floor.

In 1967, the Bangor Normal College, now part of the university, was the venue for lectures on Transcendental Meditation by the Maharishi Mahesh Yogi at which The Beatles heard of the death of their manager, Brian Epstein.

Student protests at UCNW in the 1970s focused mainly on calls to expand the role of the Welsh language. Radical students would disturb lectures held in English and paint slogans in Welsh on the walls of the Main Building, resulting in a number of suspensions of these activists. In the early 1980s, the Thatcher government even considered closing down the institution. Around this time consideration began of mergers with two colleges of education in Bangor: St Mary's College, a college for women studying to become schoolteachers, and the larger and older Normal College/Coleg Normal. The merger of St Mary's into UCNW was concluded in 1977, but the merger with Coleg Normal fell through in the 1970s and was not completed until 1996.

Name change
The 2007 change of name to Bangor University, or Prifysgol Bangor in Welsh, was instigated by the university following the decision of the University of Wales to change from a federal university to a confederal non-membership organisation, and the granting of degree-awarding powers to Bangor University itself. As a result, every student starting after 2009 gained a degree from Bangor University, while any student who started before 2009 had the option to have either Bangor University or University of Wales Bangor on their degree certificate.

Issues in the 2010s
Under John Hughes's leadership as Vice-Chancellor (2010–18), there were a number of new developments including the opening of St Mary's Student Village, and the first ever collaboration between Wales and China to establish a new college, which involved Bangor University and the Central South University of Forestry and Technology (CSUFT).

In 2014, Hughes took out a £45m loan from the European Investment Bank, to assist the university in developing its estates strategy. In 2016, the university opened Marine Centre Wales, a £5.5m building on the site of the university's Ocean Sciences campus in Menai Bridge, which was financed as part of the £25 million SEACAMS project, part funded through the European Regional Development Fund (ERDF).

In May 2017, Bangor became the fourth Welsh university to review its cost base with a view to making savings of £8.5m. The university responded and introduced a number of cost saving measures including a reorganization of the structure of Colleges and Schools and the introduction of a voluntary severance scheme, and the numbers of compulsory redundancies was reduced from the initial estimate of 170. In addressing its financial challenges, Bangor University also reorganised some subject areas in 2017, which involved introducing new ways of co-ordinating and delivering adult education and part-time degree programmes, continuing to teach archaeology, but discontinuing the single honours course, and working with Grwp Llandrillo Menai to validate the BA Fine Art degree.

Other issues which attracted adverse media comment included the cost overrun and delayed opening of the Pontio Arts and Innovation Centre in 2016, the appointment of Hughes's then wife to a newly created senior management position, the purchase and refurbishment of a house for the vice-chancellor by the university (costing the institution £750,000), the expenses of some senior staff, and the discrepancy between senior management salaries and remuneration for staff working on zero hour contracts. In 2016, Hughes received a 7.5% pay rise and the university confirmed that this was the first increase that the vice-chancellor had received from the university's remuneration committee (of which Hughes himself was a member) since his appointment in 2010, although he would still have received an annual pay rise.

From Hughes's takeover in 2010, when Bangor University made a £4.2 million profit, to 2017, the university's nominal income had risen by 12 per cent, but their expenditures by 19 per cent with the university's interests and finance costs (despite very low interest rates) soaring by 747 per cent. In 2017/18, the university had to spend £10m in interest payments on its debts. From 2013/14 to 2017/18, Bangor University cut staff numbers from 1777.7 to 1608 FTE (minus 9.5 per cent). During the same period, student numbers grew from 10.646 to 11.156 (plus 4.8 per cent), increasing income from student fees. In early 2019, an accountant who studied the university's finances on behalf of trade union criticised that the figures suggested spending had been diverted from staff costs to financing building projects.

When a new financial crisis as well as allegations of Hughes's racist and sexist harassment against his ex-wife were revealed in late 2018 and the announced closure of the chemistry department and new staff cuts to save £5m sparked student protest, Bangor University announced Hughes's resignation by December 2018, eight months ahead of his ordinary retirement.

Between 2017 and 2019, the university underwent three rounds of staff cuts. Job insecurity as well as deteriorating working conditions and pension packages resulted in several strikes of university staff. In June 2019, the university launched a plan to concentrate its non-residential estate onto a single campus in Bangor (Deiniol Road and College Road sites) and dispose of some major sites (including Normal Site, Dean Street and Fron Heulog), altogether 25 per cent of the estate.

In September 2020, the university announced a new round of cuts to fill a £13m gap in the budget, saying 200 more jobs (including 80 academic posts) were at risk. Another reorganization of the university's structure of Colleges and Schools was announced as well. Thereupon staff passed a motion of no confidence in the university management.

Campus and buildings

The university occupies a substantial proportion of Bangor and also has part of its School of Healthcare Sciences in Wrexham.

Arts Building 

The university was originally based in an old coaching inn, the Penrhyn Arms Hotel, which housed its 58 students and its 12 teaching staff. In 1911 it moved to a much larger new building, which is now the old part of the Main Arts Building. This building, designed by Henry Hare, had its foundation stone laid by King Edward VII on 9 July 1907, and was formally opened by King George V in 1911. The iconic building, which occupies a highly visible position overlooking Bangor, gave the college its Welsh nickname Y Coleg ar y Bryn ("The College on the Hill"). It included the large Prichard-Jones Hall, named after Sir John Prichard-Jones a local man who became a partner in the London department store Dickins & Jones, and was a substantial benefactor of the building. The building became a Grade I listed building in 1949.

A modern extension, completing a quadrangle on the College Road side of the building, was completed in 1969. This is now known as the Main Arts Building.

Pontio 
The university's arts and innovation centre Pontio opened in 2016. The building includes teaching and social spaces and houses the offices of the students' union.

Organisation

The Academic Activities of Bangor University are grouped into three colleges:

 College of Arts, Humanities and Business
 Bangor Business School
 School of History, Law and Social Sciences
 School of Arts, Culture and Language

 College of Environmental Sciences and Engineering
 School of Computer Science and Electronic Engineering
 School of Natural Sciences
 School of Ocean Sciences

 College of Human Sciences
 School of Educational Sciences
 School of Medical and Health Sciences
 School of Human and Behavioural Sciences

Academic profile

Research 
The university's research expertise in the areas of materials science and predictive modelling was enhanced during 2017 through a collaboration with Imperial College London and the formation of the Nuclear Futures Institute at Bangor with the award of £6.5m in funding under the Welsh Government's Ser Cymru programme.

The university-owned £20m Science Park on Anglesey, M-Sparc was completed in March 2018, which will support the development of the region's low carbon energy sector.

Proposed North Wales Medical School
In 2021 the Welsh Government announced plans to expand medical teaching at the university in collaboration with Cardiff University, with the objective of establishing an independent medical school in north Wales.

Rankings 

The 2014 Research Excellence Framework recognised that more than three quarters of Bangor's research is either world-leading or internationally excellent. Based on the university submission of 14 Units of Assessment, 77% of the research was rated in the top two tiers of research quality, ahead of the average for all UK universities.

In 2017, Bangor University became the only university in Wales to be rated 'Gold' by the new Teaching Excellence Framework (TEF) which means that the university is deemed to be of the highest quality found in the UK, providing "consistently outstanding teaching, learning and outcomes for its students."

In recent years, Bangor has been rated highly by its students in two independent surveys of student opinion. In the National Student Survey, the university has been consistently ranked highly both within Wales and in the UK higher education sector. In 2017, Bangor University's students placed the university eighth among the UK's non-specialist universities and second among Welsh Universities.

For the second year in a row Bangor was awarded Best University in the UK for Clubs and Societies at the 2018 WhatUni Student Choice Awards. It also regained the award for best Student Accommodation which they originally won in 2016. The university was also placed second overall for 'Courses and Lecturers' and retained third place in the category 'University of the Year'. WhatUni award nominations are based on the reviews and opinions of the university's own students. This is the fourth year in a row that Bangor University has won a national WhatUni Award.

Student life

Halls of residence 
University Hall, built in red brick a Queen Anne style, was the first substantial block. It was opened in 1897. This building was to become the Welsh-language hall Neuadd John Morris-Jones in 1974, taking its name in honour of Professor John Morris Jones. It is now called Neuadd Rathbone.

Neuadd Reichel, built on the Ffriddoedd Farm site, was designed in a neo-Georgian style by the architect Percy Thomas and was opened in 1942 as a hostel for male students.

Expansion in the 1960s led to the development of Plas Gwyn in 1963–64 and Neuadd Emrys Evans in 1965, both on the Ffriddoedd site, and Neuadd Rathbone at the top of Love Lane in 1965. Neuadd Rathbone, designed by Colwyn Foulkes and named after the second President of the college, was originally for women students only. The names of Neuadd Rathbone and Neuadd John Morris-Jones were later exchanged. The building originally opened as Neuadd Rathbone is now known as Neuadd Garth.

Accommodation is guaranteed for all first-year undergraduate students. There are around 3,000 rooms available in halls of residence, all within walking distance of the university. There are three residential sites in current use: Ffriddoedd Village, St Mary's Village and Neuadd Garth.

Ffriddoedd Village 

The largest accommodation site is the Ffriddoedd Village in Upper Bangor, about ten minutes' walk from Top College, the Science Site and the city centre. This site has eleven en-suite halls completed in 2009, six other en-suite halls built in the 1990s and Neuadd Reichel built in the 1940s, and renovated in 2011.

Two of the en-suite halls, Bryn Dinas and Tegfan, now incorporate the new Neuadd John Morris-Jones, which started its life in 1974 on College Road and has, along with its equivalent Neuadd Pantycelyn in Aberystwyth, became a focal point of Welsh-language activities at the university. It is an integral part of UMCB, the Welsh Students' Union, which in turn is part of the main Students' Union.

The halls on "Ffridd" (ffridd [friːð] is the Welsh word for mountain pasture or sheep path; ffriddoedd [ˈfrɪðɔið] is its plural form) include Cefn y Coed, Glyder, Y Borth, Elidir, J.M.J. Bryn Dinas and J.M.J. Tegfan, all of which were built in the early 1990s; Adda, Alaw, Braint, Crafnant, Enlli, Peris, Glaslyn, Llanddwyn, Ffraw, Idwal and Gwynant, which were all built in the late 2000s; and Neuadd Reichel which was built in the 1940s and renovated in 2011. From 2021, Neuadd Reichel will no longer be used for student accommodation.

St Mary's Village 
Bryn Eithin overlooks the centre of Bangor and is close to the Science Departments and the Schools of Computer Science and Electronic Engineering. Demolition of the former St Mary's Site halls, with the exception of the 1902 buildings and the Quadrangle, began in 2014 to make way for new halls which were completed in 2015. The halls on this site are Cybi, Penmon, and Cemlyn, which are all self-catered flats; Tudno, which is a townhouse complex; and the original St. Mary's building, with studios and flats.

In Welsh, bryn means "hill" and eithin means "gorse".

Private halls
A private hall of residence called Tŷ Willis House (formerly known as Neuadd Willis) is operated by iQ Student Accommodation; which incorporates the old listed British Hotel with a new extension to the rear, and a further hall on the site of the old Plaza Cinema. Other privately owned halls of residence in Bangor include Neuadd Kyffin, Neuadd y Castell, Neuadd Llys y Deon and Neuadd Tŷ Ni.

Undeb Bangor, Bangor University Students' union 
Undeb Bangor, Bangor University students' union, provides services, support, activities and opportunities for students. All students automatically become members unless they opt out. Annual elections are held for several sabbatical officers are elected; President, UMCB President, VP for Education, VP for Societies and Volunteering and VP for Sports. These sabbatical officers are accountable for the actions and decisions of the union, and often work closely with members of the Student Council and other boards.

In January 2016 the students' union moved to the new Pontio Arts and Innovation Centre.

Volunteering 
SVB (Student Volunteering Bangor) is the volunteering branch the students' union, which has supported community projects in and around the Bangor area since 1952. SVB volunteers provide a total of around 600 hours work per week on 58 community based projects, including projects on mental health, children, the environment, the elderly and community & sport projects. SVB works closely with charities, organisations and schools around Bangor and North Wales, as well as further afield.

In 1952, SVB organised a tea party for local elderly residents. The tea party project continues to this day and is SVB's oldest project.

Bangor Rag is an SVB project that collects money for two local and two national charities, which change every academic year and are chosen by the students. Rag members regularly attend "raids" across the country and assist charities with one-off events throughout the year. Their mascot is a tiger named Rhodri Rag.

Sports Clubs 
There are more than 90 societies and over 50 sports clubs, ranging from academic societies to a wide range of sports clubs. Notable sports clubs include Bangor University F.C. (football) and Bangor University Rowing Club.

Every year the university competes against Aberystwyth University in Varsity; a sporting tournament which sees hundreds of students compete in over 40 sporting events for the Varsity Trophy.

Societies
There are around 100 student societies which bring like-minded people together. These include are course-related societies; societies that celebrate nationalities and cultures and societies for students with specific interests like drama, music, film and photography. Membership of the societies is free.

Student newspaper
Y Seren is the university's official English language student newspaper. It covers important student events such as sabbatical officer elections and the annual sports competition. The newspaper is published monthly and has a website where every issue is archived. The newspaper's offices are located in the Pontio Arts Centre building.

Student radio
Storm FM is the official student radio station for Bangor University and is one of only three student radio stations in the UK with a long-term FM licence, which authorises broadcasting to a very small area of Bangor, namely the Ffriddoed Road Halls of Residence. Storm FM went on air in March 2003, and began streaming online in 2009.

Student Council 
The Student Council is a forum that meets monthly in the academic year to discuss, debate, and pass ideas, as well as working alongside the sabbatical officers on projects to improve the student experience.

Course representatives 
The course representatives (course reps) scheme is run by Undeb Bangor. There are 300 course reps across the 14 different academic schools.

In 2022 Undeb Bangor announced the introduction LGBTQ+ reps into the course rep system, to champion the LGBTQ+ community and represent LGBTQ+ students.

Notable people associated with Bangor

Presidents/Chancellor
 Edward Herbert, 3rd Earl of Powis, 1884–1891
 William Rathbone 1891–1900
 Lloyd Tyrell-Kenyon, 4th Baron Kenyon 1900–1927
 Herbert Gladstone, 1st Viscount Gladstone 1927–1935
 Lord Howard de Walden 1935–1940
 William Ormsby-Gore, 4th Baron Harlech 1940–1945
 Charles Paget, 6th Marquess of Anglesey 1945–1947
 Lloyd Tyrell-Kenyon, 5th Baron Kenyon 1947–1982
William Mars-Jones 1982–1995
 Cledwyn Hughes 1995–2000
 Dafydd Elis-Thomas 2000–2017
 George Meyrick 2017–present

Vice Chancellors
The university has had nine Principals/Vice-Chancellors:

 Henry Reichel, Principal 1884–1927
 David Emrys Evans, Principal 1927–1958
 Charles Evans, Principal 1958–1984
 Eric Sunderland, Principal, Vice-Chancellor 1984–1995
 Roy Evans, Vice-Chancellor 1995–2004
 Merfyn Jones, Vice-Chancellor, 2004–2010
 John G Hughes, Vice-Chancellor 2010–2018
 Graham Upton, Vice-Chancellor 2018–2019
 Iwan Davies, Vice-Chancellor 2019–2022
 Edmund Burke, Vice-Chancellor 2022 -

Notable academics

 Samuel L. Braunstein, quantum physicist, 1997–2004
 Ronald Brown, English mathematician known for his work in algebraic topology
 Tony Conran, poet and translator, Reader in English and Tutor until 1983
 David Crystal, linguist and author, honorary professor of Linguistics
 A. H. Dodd, historian, 1919–1958
 Israel Dostrovsky (1918-2010), Russian (Ukraine)-born Israeli physical chemist, fifth president of the Weizmann Institute of Science
 John L. Harper, biologist, ecologist, British scholar and scientist, 1925-2009
 Raimund Karl, archaeologist, 2003–2020
 , historian, eighth director of the Swiss Social Archives, 2007–2014
 Bedwyr Lewis Jones, scholar
 William Mathias, composer, former professor of music
 John Morris-Jones, pioneering Welsh grammarian, editor, poet and literary critic
 Guto Puw, Welsh composer
 Duncan Tanner, historian of the Labour Party, 1989-2010
 John Meurig Thomas, Department of Chemistry
 Gwyn Thomas, Welsh scholar and poet
 Margaret Thrall, Welsh theologian and Anglican priest
 Innes McCartney, British scientist
 Stephen Eichhorn, British materials scientist

Notable alumni

 Danny Boyle, film director and producer, graduate in English and drama
 Paul Bérenger, former Prime Minister of Mauritius
 Martin J. Ball, emeritus professor of linguistcis at Bangor University, Cymru/Wales.
 Frances Barber, actress
 Richard Brunstrom, Chief Constable of North Wales Police
 Gordon Conway, president of the Royal Geographical Society, Vice Chancellor of the University of Sussex
 Paul Alan Cox, ethnobotanist
 Colin Eaborn, chemist
 Aled Eames, maritime historian and warden of Neuadd Reichel in the 1950s and 1960s
 Robert G. Edwards, physiologist and pioneer in reproductive medicine, won the 2010 Nobel Prize in Physiology or Medicine.
 John Evans, film director
 Bill Fay, singer/musician and recording artist
 Raymond Garlick, poet and editor
 Tony Gillam, musician and writer
 Mary Dilys Glynne, plant pathologist
 Gwynn ap Gwilym, poet
 Lowri Gwilym, television and radio producer
 Tim Haines, BBC producer
 Julian Hibberd, plant scientist, named by Nature as one of "Five crop researchers who could change the world"
 Howel Harris Hughes, theologian, Presbyterian minister and Principal of the United Theological College, Aberystwyth.
 Siân James, traditional/folk singer and musician
 Ann Clwyd, Labour MP 1984 - 2019
 Einir Jones, poet
 Kathy Jones, Anglican priest and Dean of Bangor
 Martha Elizabeth Newton, bryologist and cytologist
 John Ogwen, actor
 R. Williams Parry, poet
 Tom Parry Jones, scientist, developer of the first handheld electronic breathalyser
 Mmusi Maimane, South African politician
 Bethany C. Morrow, author
 Stefan Rahmstorf, professor of Physics of the Oceans at Potsdam University
 Derek Ratcliffe, botanist, zoologist and nature conservationist
 Howard Riley, jazz pianist and composer
 Gareth Roberts, physicist and university administrator
 Kate Roberts, writer
 Andy Rowley, TV Producer
 John Sessions, actor
 Lyndon Smith (academic), Professor in Computer Simulation and Machine Vision, University of the West of England
 Gwyn Thomas, poet and academic, National Poet of Wales
 R. S. Thomas, poet and Anglican priest
 Derick Thomson, Scottish Gaelic poet, publisher, academic and writer
 Tim Wheeler, Vice-Chancellor of the University of Chester
 Roger Whittaker, musician
 Bill Wiggin, Conservative MP for Leominster
 Gareth Williams, Secret Intelligence Service employee
 Ifor Williams, historian and editor of Welsh literature
 Herbert Wilson, physicist who worked on the structure of DNA
 Hamza Yassin, TV presenter and wildlife cameraman. Zoology with conservation graduate
 Fahad Abdulrahman Badar, Qatari Mountaineer and banker
 Denis Kwok, singer and actor; member of Hong Kong Cantopop group 'ERROR'

Fictional alumni
 The title character of Helen Fielding's 1996 novel Bridget Jones's Diary attended Bangor University.

See also
 Armorial of UK universities
 List of universities in the United Kingdom
 List of universities in Wales
 List of forestry universities and colleges

References

Further reading
Clarke, M. L. (1966) Architectural History & Guide (University College of North Wales, Bangor); Online (Bangor Civic Society)
Roberts, David (2009) Bangor University, 1884–2009. Cardiff: University of Wales Press 
Williams, J. Gwynn (1985) The University College of North Wales – Foundations 1884–1927. Cardiff: University of Wales Press

External links

Bangor University – Official website
Bangor University Students Union (UNDEB)
The legacy of Bangor University vice-chancellor John G. Hughes (2010–18)

 
Bangor
Universities and colleges in North Wales
Educational institutions established in 1884
Bangor, Gwynedd
1884 establishments in Wales
Buildings by Henry Hare
Universities established in the 19th century
Law schools in Wales
Universities UK